Port Said International Schools are two sister schools located in Port Said, Egypt. One offers national education and the other offers international education.

The national section is called Port Said Integrated Language School (from KG stage to grade 12).

The international section, which is called Port Said International School, offers American curriculum in all its grades. The school was opened for enrollment in May 2005.

References 

National school official website
National section staff 
International school official website
International section staff

Schools in Port Said
2005 establishments in Egypt
Educational institutions established in 2005